Anders Bogsjö (born 16 June 1966) is a retired Swedish football goalkeeper.

References

1966 births
Living people
Swedish footballers
IF Elfsborg players
Association football goalkeepers
Allsvenskan players